The 2022 NWSL Challenge Cup was a league cup competition that took place during the 2022 National Women's Soccer League season. It was the third iteration of the NWSL Challenge Cup tournament.

Format 
The 2022 NWSL Challenge Cup was a multi-stage tournament. All 12 NWSL teams participated in the Challenge Cup, an increase of two from the previous edition due to the addition of expansion franchises Angel City FC and San Diego Wave FC during the offseason. As a result, the competition was split into three regional groups of four teams each; East, Central and West. Each team played a six-game double round-robin in which every team played all others in its division at home and away. The winner from each of the three divisions along with the highest-ranked group stage runner-up progressed to the knockout stage, which consisted of three single-elimination matches: two semifinals and one final. As a result of the expanded group stage, teams played a minimum of six games, two more than in 2021, and a maximum of eight, three more than in 2021. A total of 39 matches were played, 18 more than the 21 matches played during the 2021 NWSL Challenge Cup. 

No matches had extra time. In the group stage, matches could end in a tie at the end of normal playing time. In the knockout stage, if a match was tied at the end of normal playing time, the game was decided by a penalty shoot-out.

Teams were required to have a minimum of 18 players and a maximum of 20 players on a matchday roster. A maximum of nine players could be named as substitutes with a maximum of five substitutions in three stoppages (excluding half-time) permitted to be used during a match. No substitutes could be made after the end of normal playing time (except if a goalkeeper was unable to continue before or during the penalty shoot-out). Two "concussion substitutes" could also be used in accordance with IFAB rules.

Tiebreakers 
A team's position in the divisional standings was determined by points, with three points awarded for a win, one point for a tie, and zero points for a loss. If two or more teams in the same group were tied on points at the end of the group stage, the following tiebreaking criteria were applied to determine the final group standings:

 Greatest goal difference across all group stage matches.
 Most goals scored across all group stage matches.
 Direct head-to-head points record with teams involved in the tie.
 Direct head-to-head goal difference in matches between teams involved in the tie.
 Direct head-to-head number of goals scored in matches between teams involved in the tie.
 Fewest disciplinary points accrued. Points were awarded as follows (players could receive only one disciplinary points assessment per match, with the highest taking precedent):
  yellow card: 1 point;
  indirect red card (as a result of two yellow cards): 3 points;
  direct red card: 4 points;
  yellow card and direct red card: 5 points.
 If teams still could not be separated using the tiebreaking procedures, the NWSL would decide ranking using the random drawing of lots.

In the case of two or more teams from different divisions being tied on points at the end of the group stage, the same procedure was followed except for the use of the head-to-head scenarios by virtue of the fact teams from different divisions would not have played each other during the group stage.

Group stage

East Division

Standings

Matches

Central Division

Standings

Matches

West Division

Standings

Matches

Ranking of second-placed teams 
The best second-placed team from the group stage advanced to the knockout stage.

Knockout stage 
The seeding of the division winners was determined by points accumulated in the group stage, followed if necessary by any applicable tiebreakers. The advancing second-place team was automatically made the #4 seed.

Bracket

Semifinals

Championship

Statistics

Goalscorers 

Statistics do not include penalty-shootout goals.

Discipline 
A player was automatically suspended for the next match in the tournament for the following offenses:
 Receiving a red card (red card suspensions may be extended for serious offenses);
 Receiving two yellow cards in two matches, unless the second yellow card was accumulated in the final match of group play;
 Direct red card suspensions were carried over to the 2022 NWSL regular season. Suspensions as a result of indirect red cards were not carried over.

The following suspensions were served during the tournament:

Awards

All-Tournament Team 
Debinha was named the MVP for the second consecutive Challenge Cup.

# Tournament MVP

Weekly awards

References

External links 

2022
2022 in American soccer leagues
2022 National Women's Soccer League season
NWSL